Solanum commersonii is a species of wild potato in the family Solanaceae. It is native to southern Brazil, Uruguay, and northeastern Argentina, and has been introduced to Mauritius. It is being extensively studied for its resistance to root knot nematode, soft rot, blackleg, bacterial wilt, verticillium wilt, Potato virus X, tobacco etch virus, common scab, and late blight, and for its frost tolerance and ability to cold acclimate, in an effort to improve the domestic potato Solanum tuberosum.

References

commersonii
Flora of South Brazil
Flora of Uruguay
Flora of Northeast Argentina
Plants described in 1814